Luis García Tevenet (born 8 May 1974) is a Spanish former footballer who played as a forward, currently manager of Atlético Madrid B.

In a 16-year professional career, spent mainly with Sevilla, he appeared in 359 matches across the two major divisions of Spanish football, scoring 69 goals.

Playing career
Born in Seville, Andalusia, and a product of hometown Sevilla FC's prolific youth system, Tevenet made his first-team and La Liga debut on 2 January 1994, playing 29 minutes in a 1–0 home win against Real Sociedad. However, he would never be more than a relatively used attacking player, mainly off the bench.

Tevenet completed his football development aged 23 when he joined Atlético Madrid B, appearing in five matches for the main squad during the 1998–99 season as a substitute. Subsequently, he spent two years at UD Las Palmas (with a loan to old team Sevilla in between, in the Segunda División), scoring five goals in 28 games in his last year – only nine starts – as the Canarians suffered top-flight relegation.

After that, Tevenet competed mostly in the second tier and the Segunda División B, with Polideportivo Ejido, Algeciras CF, CD Numancia (with a brief top-division return in the 2004–05 campaign) and UE Lleida. For 2007–08 he joined Orihuela CF where, after a season and a half, he retired and became the new coach of the team.

Coaching career
In late 2009, Tevenet was in charge of Jerez Industrial CF in division three for only a month before quitting due to the club's financial problems. In March 2010, following former Sevilla teammate Manolo Jiménez's dismissal, he returned to the Ramón Sánchez Pizjuán Stadium and was appointed assistant manager, leaving his post in September after Antonio Álvarez was fired. 

Tevenet returned to the third tier with CD San Roque de Lepe in 2011, leaving after one year. He then signed for fellow league side UCAM Murcia CF, halfway through a season that ended in relegation. He remained in the Region of Murcia for 2013–14 at FC Cartagena, leaving after a 5–1 aggregate defeat to Real Avilés in the promotion playoffs.

On 29 June 2014, Tevenet was appointed manager of SD Huesca. He led the Aragonese to first place in their group, and promotion to the second division via a 3–1 aggregate win over Huracán Valencia CF in the playoffs. He was relieved of his duties on 30 November, after four consecutive defeats.

Tevenet was named coach of Hércules CF on 1 July 2016, and was sacked the following 5 March for a poor run of form. On 22 June 2017, he returned to Sevilla to manage the reserves in the second division. After his season ended with relegation he left for another B team, Atlético Levante UD.

Managerial statistics

Honours

Player
Las Palmas
Segunda División: 1999–2000

Sevilla
Segunda División: 2000–01

References

External links

1974 births
Living people
Spanish footballers
Footballers from Seville
Association football forwards
La Liga players
Segunda División players
Segunda División B players
Sevilla Atlético players
Sevilla FC players
Atlético Madrid B players
Atlético Madrid footballers
UD Las Palmas players
Polideportivo Ejido footballers
Algeciras CF footballers
CD Numancia players
UE Lleida players
Orihuela CF players
Spanish football managers
Segunda División managers
Segunda División B managers
Segunda Federación managers
Tercera Federación managers
UCAM Murcia CF managers
FC Cartagena managers
SD Huesca managers
Hércules CF managers
Sevilla Atlético managers
Atlético Levante UD managers
Atlético Madrid B managers